Perittia ochrella is a moth in the family Elachistidae. It was described by Sinev in 1992. It is found in the Russian Far East and Japan.

References

Moths described in 1992
Elachistidae
Moths of Asia
Moths of Japan